GRAITEC is an Autodesk Reseller and developer of CAD / CAE software for the civil engineering and construction industries.

Headquartered in France, the company was founded in 1986 by Francis Guillemard. GRAITEC went from a single company located in France to a group of 11 wholly owned companies spread around the world (France, Germany, Spain, Czech Republic, Italy, Slovakia, Russia, Romania, United Kingdom, Canada and United States).

History 

 1986, GRAITEC was founded by Francis Guillemard.
 1989: Launched 3 design softwares: Effel (Finite Element Analysis software for concrete, steel and timber), Arche (building simulation and automated detailing software for concrete building) and Melody (2D Steel frame analysis software that features automatic connection design and drawing creation).
 1999: Created GRAITEC Romania
 2001: Created GRAITEC Inc in Canada[5]; launched Advanced Concrete, for reinforced concrete modeling and detailing in AutoCAD; GRAITEC became an Autodesk Unique Application reseller.
 2002: Acquired DSC CAD/CAM-Technologien GmbH in Germany. HyperSteel software (Steel Modeling and Detailing) served as the technical platform in the development of Advance Steel; GRAITEC SA became the operational holding company; Creation of GRAITEC SARL in France; Launched Advanced Steel, a high-end steel modeling and detailing system in AutoCAD®
 2003: Created GRAITEC USA Inc. in Boston; Acquired AB Studio spol. s.r.o. in the Czech republic and expanded the GRAITEC Suite with CADKON (Architecture and MEP suite on AutoCAD®).
 2004: Made agreements with additional distribution partnerships in Russia and Poland.
 2005: Launched Advanced Design, a new generation structural analysis software; entered into an agreement with a new distribution partner in China.
 2006: DSC CAD/CAM-Technologien GmbH became GRAITEC GmbH; Built New partnerships in Europe (Baltic Countries, etc.), in Asia (Philippines, South Korea, etc.) and had first customers in Latin America (Chile, Colombia, Mexico, Venezuela, etc.).
 2007: Acquired Adris Ltd. in the UK and expanded the GRAITEC Suite with MILLERCAD (Office layout design); Acquired CivilDesign Inc. in Canada and expanded the GRAITEC Suite with VisualDesign (Finite Element Analysis software for concrete, steel and timber).

In 2008, the company acquired Computer Service im Ingenieurbau GmbH (CSI) in Germany, Integer Ltd. in the UK, and Abc service in France. It also further expanded its software suite with SuperSUITE, CS Statik, and CS Pons, which all analyze and calculate steel and concrete designs.

In 2009, GRAITEC CJSC was launched in Russia. Integer Ltd. also rebranded as GRAITEC UK. CivilDesign and GRAITEC merged to become one single entity. The following year, GRAITEC Asia launched in Singapore. CSI and GRAITEC GmbH merged in 2011 to become GRAITEC GmbH.

In 2015, the company acquired Total CAD Systems, Inc. in Houston. GRAITEC became an Autodesk Gold Level reseller in 2018.

GRAITEC acquired Opentree Ltd and its document management system, Cabinet, in 2019. Acquisition of 2aCAD. This was also the year that Apax Partners acquired a majority stake in GRAITEC.

Cadpoint UK was acquired in November 2020.

In 2021, Graitec acquired Canadian-based company Strucsoft Solutions, and the Spanish-based structural analysis company Arktec.

In 2022, Graitec announces agreement to acquire Applied Software to become world leader of AEC and Manufacturing System Integration. Originally founded in 1982, Atlanta-based Applied Software is a historic Autodesk partner. With 130 employees located in more than 20 states, Applied Software has helped over 5,000 customers to digitize their processes in the construction and manufacturing space throughout the United States.

With the acquisition of Applied Software, the Graitec group consolidates its existing position in North America while taking on significant market share of the BIM market.

Products

GRAITEC offers CAD and CAE analysis and design software for the civil engineering and construction fields. Its Advance Software suite integrates the following features: data exchange tools between engineering and detailing, tools for pre-dimensioning in CAD models, and automatic document management.

Advance Concrete 

Advance Concrete is a reinforced concrete modeling and detailing software in AutoCAD, with automated creation of reinforcement and formwork drawings and bill of materials. Launched in 2001, Advance Concrete was the first application in the Advance Suite.

Advance Steel 

Advance Steel is a major extension of AutoCAD for structural steel modeling and detailing and automatic creation of general arrangement drawings, fabrication drawings, material lists and NC files. Advance Steel was specifically developed for the steel industry to increase design productivity and production quality through the acceleration of the modeling process. Advance Steel has been transferred to Autodesk.

Advance Design 

Advance Design is a FEM analysis and design software for reinforced concrete, steel work and timber design integrating advanced functionalities for structure modeling, finite elements analysis and results post-processing. It conducts static and dynamic analysis of 2D and 3D structures, from bridges and culverts to buildings and towers. Advance Design is currently available in two versions: one according to North American standards and the other according to European standards.

Subsidiaries

 GRAITEC Inc., North America, located in Longueuil, Quebec, Canada
 AB Studio spol. s.r.o, Acquired by Graitec in 2003
 GRAITEC SARL, France
 GRAITEC GmbH, Germany. Acquired by GRAITEC in 2002
 GRAITEC Romania SRL
 GRAITEC Iberica, Spain. Launched in June 2007
 Adris Ltd., United Kingdom. Acquired in 2007 by Graitec
 Integer Software Ltd., United Kingdom

References

Computer-aided design
Computer-aided engineering software
Construction and civil engineering companies of France
Product lifecycle management
Software companies of France
Companies based in Paris
Construction and civil engineering companies established in 1986
French companies established in 1986